Songdo First World is the first completed residential project in Songdo IBD, South Korea. There are 12 buildings ranging from three to 64 floors. Currently, there are 2,685 units within the complex. This luxury apartment was designed by KPF and BAUM. It is located adjacent to the Songdo convensia, Northeast Asia Trade Tower and the subway station.

References

External links 
 Songdo official website

Skyscrapers in Incheon
Residential skyscrapers in South Korea
Kohn Pedersen Fox buildings
Songdo International Business District